, is a Japanese storyboard artist and animated film director. He directed a number of animated television series produced by Nippon Animation during the 1970s and 1980s. Kurokawa was the series director of Animated Classics of Japanese Literature, included among the "100 Must-See Japanese Animation Masterpieces" in the 2007 encyclopedia Anime Classics Zettai!.

Filmography

References

External links 
 
 Little Princess Sara Staff Interview: Fumio Kurokawa
Fumio Kurokawa at Facebook
Fumio Kurokawa at instagram

1932 births
Living people
Anime directors
Japanese animators
Japanese animated film directors
Japanese storyboard artists